Naalakkersuisut is the chief executive body and the government of Greenland since the island became self-governing in 1979. An autonomous territory of the Kingdom of Denmark, takes place in a framework of a parliamentary representative democratic territory, whereby the premier leads the cabinet, and of a multi-party system.

There are around 10 members of the Cabinet, known as "Ministers", all of whom are also heads of specific government ministries. The ministers are appointed by the Prime Minister. The Greenlandic government currently consists of 10 ministers including the Prime Minister.

Executive power
Executive power rests with a high commissioner, and a prime minister heads the Cabinet. The high commissioner of Greenland is appointed by the monarch (since 2011: Queen Margrethe II), and the prime minister is elected indirectly by parliament elections results for four-year terms.

Current cabinet

The Naalakkersuisut is divided into a number of areas of responsibility each led by a Naalakkersuisoq with powers corresponding to that of a minister or secretary of government. The cabinet is based on a coalition in the Inatsisartut of the parties Inuit Ataqatigiit and Naleraq with the support of Atassut. Since 23 April 2021, the current composition of the Naalakkersuisut is as follows:

|}

Legislative power 
Legislative power is shared by the government and the legislature. The legislature or Self-rule of Greenland is made up of 31 members in the Inatsisartut elected by direct, popular vote to serve four-year terms.

The current composition is shown below:

Judicial power 
The judiciary is independent of the executive and the legislature. Greenland has full autonomy on most matters, except on policies and decisions affecting the region including negotiations with the devolved legislatures and the Kingdom Parliament Folketing.
Greenland's judicial system has mainly been derived from the Danish civil law system. It has one court of first instance: the Court of Greenland, and an appeal court the High Court of Greenland. No appeal is possible to decisions of the Joint Court of Justice, but fundamental "questions of law" may be submitted to the Østre Landsret and the Supreme Court of Denmark in cassation. Verdicts by those institutions may lead to a new decision of the Joint Court, taking into account the results of the cassation.

Naalakkersuisut 2016
In late October 2016, the current government coalition was changed to consist of the parties Siumut (S), Inuit Ataqatigiit (IA), and Partii Naleraq (PN). The composition of the Naalakkersuisut was as follows:

Naalakkersuisut 2014
Parliamentary elections were held on 28 November 2014 and Kim Kielsen, leader of the Siumut party, was designated as Prime Minister by a coalition of the parties Siumut, Democrats, and Atassut. The coalition was formed on 4 December 2014, Siumut has five ministers, Democrats 2 and Attasut 2.

Naalakkersuisut 2013

Parliamentary elections were held on March 12, 2013, and Aleqa Hammond, leader of the Siumut party, was designated as Prime Minister by a coalition of the parties Siumut, Partii Inuit, and Atassut.

References

External links
 Naalakkersuisut.gl - Official website of The Cabinet of Greenland 
 Naalakkersuisut.gl - Official website of The Cabinet of Greenland 

 
Government of Greenland
Greenland
Politics of Greenland
Greenland politics-related lists